Otaka, Ōtaka or Ootaka (written: ,  or  in hiragana) is a Japanese surname. Notable people with the surname include:

, Japanese actor
, Japanese actor
, Japanese actress, singer and politician
, Japanese swimmer

Notable people with the surname include:

, Japanese composer and musicologist
, Japanese composer and conductor
, Japanese music conductor

Japanese-language surnames